Pác Miầu is a township and capital of Bảo Lâm District, Cao Bằng Province, Vietnam.

References

Populated places in Cao Bằng province
District capitals in Vietnam
Townships in Vietnam